These are the results of the women's individual all-around competition, one of six events for female competitors in artistic gymnastics at the 1976 Summer Olympics in Montreal. The qualification and final rounds took place on July 18, 19, and 21 at the Montreal Forum.

Results

Qualification

Eighty-six gymnasts competed in the compulsory and optional rounds on July 18 and 19. The thirty-six highest scoring gymnasts advanced to the final on July 21. Each country was limited to three competitors in the final. Half of the points earned by each gymnast during both the compulsory and optional rounds carried over to the final. This constitutes each gymnast's "prelim" score.

Final

Remaining placings

References

External links
Official Olympic report
www.gymnasticsresults.com
www.gymn-forum.net

Women's individual all-around
1976 in women's gymnastics
Women's events at the 1976 Summer Olympics